The Sondhia are a Hindu caste found in the state of Rajasthan in India.

History and origin 

They are a community of small farmers, and rajput. although the community is now being urbanized. They are a Vaishnavite  Hindu community, and have no particular customs. The Sondhia are generally considered to belong to the Backward caste category.

References 

Social groups of Rajasthan
Indian castes